Eucalyptus georgei, commonly known as Hyden blue gum, is a species of tree or mallet that is endemic to Western Australia. It has smooth bark, glossy green, lance-shaped adult leaves, glaucous flower buds in groups of between seven and eleven, creamy white flowers and conical to cup-shaped fruit.

Description
Eucalyptus georgei is a tree or mallet that typically grows to a height of  but does not form a lignotuber. It has smooth, pale grey and coppery-orange coloured bark that detaches in long ribbons. Flowering occurs between February and March and the flowers are creamy white.

Taxonomy and naming

In 1993 Brooker and Stephen Hopper described two subspecies and the names have been accepted by the Australian Plant Census:
 Eucalyptus georgei subsp. fulgida Brooker & Hopper differs from subspecies georgei in having shiny green, non-glaucous leaves and smaller, shorter fruits;
 Eucalyptus georgei Brooker & Blaxell subsp. georgei.

The specific epithet honours the botanist Alex George for his assistance to both the authors. The epithet fulgida is from the Latin fulgidus meaning "shining".

Distribution
The Hyden blue gum is found in a small area where the Wheatbelt region meets the Goldfields-Esperance region between Hyden to east of Kalgoorlie. It grows on lateritic rises and in depressions in calcareous loam, clayey sand or sandy soils.

See also
List of Eucalyptus species

References

Eucalypts of Western Australia
georgei
Myrtales of Australia
Plants described in 1978
Taxa named by Ian Brooker